William Cornelius Patrick (19 December 1931 – 22 June 2016) was a Canadian diver who competed in the 1956 Summer Olympics.

References

External links
 William Patrick at Canadian Olympic Team

1931 births
2016 deaths
Olympic divers of Canada
Divers at the 1956 Summer Olympics
Canadian male divers
Divers at the 1954 British Empire and Commonwealth Games
Divers at the 1958 British Empire and Commonwealth Games
Commonwealth Games medallists in diving
Commonwealth Games gold medallists for Canada
Commonwealth Games silver medallists for Canada
Medallists at the 1954 British Empire and Commonwealth Games